The Skaftá is a river in South Iceland. It is primarily glacial in origin and has had its course modified by volcanic activity; as a result of both, it often floods because of glacial melting.

Course
The river's primary source is two subglacial "cauldrons" beneath Skaftájökull, part of the Vatnajökull glacier in the interior of Iceland. It also receives spring-fed water from Langisjór, a lake a short distance to the west from which a tributary called the Útfall runs into the Skaftá. Other tributaries include the North and South Ófaerá, the Grjótá, and the Hellisá.

West of Skaftárdalur, a farm named for the river valley, the Skaftá runs over a lava field in many channels, which recombine into three for the remainder of its course to the Atlantic: the Eldvatn or Ása-Eldvatn combines with the River Kúðafljót; the Ásakvísl or Árkvísla flows under a sand-covered lava field and has been affected by road construction; the third, easternmost branch, which flows near Kirkjubæjarklaustur, retains the name Skaftá but has extremely low water levels when temperatures are lowest.

The river was bridged at Kirkjubæjarklaustur in 1903 and the Ása-Eldvatn was bridged soon after. Efforts to bank and bridge the Ásakvísl have led to undermining of the bridge works and to erosion of land formerly watered by it.

Effects of 1783 eruption
As a result it is subject to jökulhlaups (glacial outburst floods), which occur every one to two years. The 2015 flood was unusually damaging, the largest since records began.

See also
 Ice cauldron (Skaftákatlar)

References

External links

Rivers of Iceland
Drainage basins of the Atlantic Ocean
Southern Region (Iceland)